

History 
It was founded on 4 August 1998 in Tehran, Iran. Members of the association were the teams:

Iran Pro League
All 2011–12 Iran Pro League's teams. (18 teams)

Azadegan League
 Aboomoslem
 Esteghlal Ahvaz 
 Bargh Shiraz
 Pas Hamedan
 Payam Mashhad
 Shirin Faraz
 Niroye Zamini
 Shemushack Noshahr
 Kowsar
 Mes Rafsanjan
 Steel Azin
 Paykan Qazvin

Organization 
The association is a member of the FFIRI and organizes a regional football league and cup.

List of champions
2000 Bargh Shiraz U-21
2001 Homa
2002 Rah Ahan
20021 Esteghlal
2003 Sepahan

1October

Officials
President: Ali Agha Mohammadi
General Secretary: Ali Mohammad Mortazavi
Councilor: Kazem Oliaei
Media Officer: Mohammadreza Tehrani
Treasurer: Abdolrahim Farid
Technical Deputy: Ali Kazemi
International  Deputy : Ali Asghar Manoussifar

President History
Ali Agha Mohammadi (1998–2008)
Mostafa Ajorlou (2008–2010)
Azizollah Mohammadi (2010–2016)
Ali Agha Mohammadi (2016–present)

References

External links 
 Official website

Sports organizations established in 1998
Football in Iran
Association football organizations